Iqaluit West was a territorial electoral district (riding) for the Legislative Assembly of Nunavut, Canada.

The riding consists of the community of Iqaluit.

Its most recent Member of the Legislative Assembly was Paul Okalik who resigned to run in the 2011 Canadian Federal Election. A by-election was held 12 September 2011.

In 2008, Okalik defeated Iqaluit Mayor, Elisapee Sheutiapik, in the 2008 provincial election.

Election results

1999 election

2004 election

2008 election

2011 by-election

References

External links
Website of the Legislative Assembly of Nunavut

Electoral districts of Qikiqtaaluk Region
1999 establishments in Nunavut
2013 disestablishments in Nunavut